Nathorstbreen is a glacier on Spitsbergen, Svalbard. It has several side glaciers. The glacier is named after Swedish polar explorer Alfred Gabriel Nathorst. A former name of the glacier was Leirbreen.

References 

Glaciers of Spitsbergen